is a fictional character in the Street Fighter series of fighting games by Capcom. Oro is an ancient martial arts master who lives a secluded life of an immortal hermit, first appearing in Street Fighter III. In spite of his overall few appearances in the series, Oro is well received and remained consistently popular with players, with commentary focused on his unusual and controversial character design.

Character design and appearances
Oro is a hermit of Japanese descent who is over 140 years old, having mastered the secrets of immortality. He lives in a deep cave within the Amazon. Although he may not seem very strong, his lack of attachments has allowed him to exceed his legendary fighting skills beyond those of an ordinary person, though he does seem to have a weakness for cute girls. He sets out on a journey to find a worthy successor of his secrets in order to kill time. Through the use of magic, he sealed one of his arms in order to even the odds in favor of his opponents as he could accidentally seriously injure or kill his opponent if he did not.

Oro appears in Street Fighter III and its subsequent iterations, Street Fighter III: 2nd Impact and Street Fighter III: 3rd Strike, noted for his unorthodox fighting style. In his ending in New Generation and 2nd Impact, Oro decides that the only martial artist he met worthy of inheriting his secrets was Ryu. In 3rd Strike, Oro's boredom has reached its limits. Many young fighters have come to him in trying to become his disciples, but no one has lasted his training long enough. One day, he heard rumors involving a "mysterious organization" and the "master of the fist" and he decided to investigate. In his ending, Oro is shown trying to make Ryu, who is unaware of Oro's presence in his training, his disciple again. Oro is a fighter more suited for patient players, who "can deal some serious damage for the player that can wait for the right opening on an opponent."

Oro later reappears in Street Fighter V during Dhalsim's character story as Dhalsim encounters him while teaching a police officer named Mahesh how to breathe fire. Oro engages a discussion with the yoga master about mastering one skill before he leaves sensing another interesting person in the area. He was later mentioned in Karin's character story as Karin travels to India to find Oro, but is told by Dhalsim that he had already left a few days prior. He is also seen in Menat's character story when Menat, sent by her master Rose, warns him of an evil power in their world, which Oro is already aware of. He was made a playable character in the game's fifth season, in which he confers with Rose and Dhalsim about this lingering Psycho Power left behind after M. Bison's defeat. He once again fights using only one arm, carrying a tortoise named Yamasen in the other.

Outside of the video game series, Oro also appears in the Street Fighter Legends: Ibuki comic book miniseries where Ibuki's final ninja exam is to challenge him. Together with her friends Elena and Makoto, she goes to the shrine on Mount Atago, where Oro has travelled to meditate. After the fight, Oro says that she actually made him think about using both hands and commends her on an entertaining challenge.

Reception
In their review of Street Fighter III, GamePro said Oro and Necro felt out of place "because of their strange attacks and supernatural powers" and would have been better suited for a Darkstalkers game. Allgame called Oro the "strangest creature of them all" in Street Fighter III and compared him to Quasimodo. IGN cited Oro as an example of the new generation of Street Fighter games that featured "genetic mutants and oddballs", as he "didn't come close to normal". GameDaily named Oro the 22nd-most bizarre fighting game character. 

UGO Networks listed Oro as one of the top 50 Street Fighter characters due to his "unorthodox, powerful, and unique" design. IGN wrote that while Oro, along with the rest of the Street Fighter III cast, is not as memorable as the characters from Street Fighter II, he was "nicely designed". Heavy.com named Oro one of the characters wanted in Super Street Fighter IV, adding that Oro would work better in 3D than in 2D. Despite appearing only in SFIII, Oro was voted 35th-most popular out of 85 Street Fighter characters in Capcom's own poll for the 15th anniversary of Street Fighter. In 2014, Capcom UK named Oro as the "3rd-Most Powerful Street Fighter Character", while in 2016, Screen Rant named Oro the "2nd-Most Powerful Street Fighter Character", adding "He was able to defeat Ryu in battle, and even fight to a draw against Akuma, proving he can hang with the toughest names in the series." Complex ranked Oro as the "20th-Best Street Fighter Character", calling him "One of the best characters in the underappreciated SF III, bar none", while Den of Geek ranked Oro at 35th, calling him "the Yoda of Street Fighter", and adding "The gimmick that he's only “playable character level” because he's willingly handicapping himself by using one arm is what makes him so rad." In their rankings of Street Fighter characters, Paste placed Oro at 35th place, commenting "Strange characters defined Street Fighter III, and Oro was definitely one of the weirdest the series has ever seen. And he’s able to take anyone on with just one hand!" Oro is ranked 21st in a worldwide Street Fighter character poll held between 2017 and 2018.

On the other hand, Electronic Gaming Monthly stated that Oro "can be hard to use as one of the few characters who has charging special attacks. He may be compared to Guile, but he isn't nearly as effective, thanks to his slowness and weak defense. It will take a dedicated gamer to master him well enough to be useful against the other characters." GamesRadar named Oro one of the worst Street Fighter characters. IGN's Martin Robinson named Oro one of the five Street Fighter characters that he does not want in Super Street Fighter IV, describing him as "ugly" and "ungainly" as well as the "oddest character to have ever appeared" in the series, yet noting that "some people adore him". In 2012, Complex included Oro on the list of ten lamest Street Fighter characters, stating that although he is "supposed to be one of the strongest characters in the game, but he's really just a creepy, dirty, old, weirdo."

References

Fictional hermits
Fictional Japanese people in video games
Fictional martial artists in video games
Male characters in video games
Street Fighter characters
Video game characters introduced in 1997
Video game characters with slowed ageing
Fictional characters with immortality